Jonathan Kerrigan (born 14 October 1972) is an English actor well known for various leading roles on TV including In The Club, Casualty, Heartbeat, Merseybeat, The Five and Reach For The Moon. Films include Diana, FLiM,
The Somnambulists ,The Best Possible Taste and The Santa Incident. He wrote and composed and starred in the short film, Fellow Creatures which has had some success in the festival circuit. He is also a musician and has composed for both television and film.

Career
He had his screen debut in the Chemical Brothers music video, "Life Is Sweet". In Peak Practice he played climber Ewan Harvey.

From 1996 to 1999 he played a Project 2000 nurse, Sam Colloby, in BBC medical drama Casualty.

In 2001, as well as starring in Merseybeat as Police Constable Steve Traynor, Kerrigan also composed the theme tune.

On 5 September 2004, Kerrigan made his first appearance as police constable Rob Walker in the British popular and long-running primetime television drama series Heartbeat, set in the 1960s in the North Riding of Yorkshire. Rob was an extremely popular character and was always in the thick of the action, including having a relationship with Helen Trent (played by Sophie Ward) who was separated but still married at the time. They went on to get married but Helen was tragically killed in an explosion in the Police House, which left Rob devastated. In April 2007, Kerrigan announced his decision to quit his role as PC Rob Walker in Heartbeat. Scottish actor Joseph McFadden replaced him as village constable Joe Mason in the following series of the show. Kerrigan's departure marked the end of another chapter in the series history, as the viewers of the show saw PC Rob Walker ride off on his motorcycle into the sunset at the end of Series 16.

In May 2010, he appeared in episode 21 of the seventh series of the US crime drama NCIS playing the character Rex Carhartt.

In 2012, he appeared in a Richard Jobson film called The Somnambulists about British servicemen and women reflecting on the action they saw in Basra during the Iraq War.
He composed some of the original music for the film including the opening title sequence.

Also in 2012, he played John Alkin in BBC Four's The Best Possible Taste, a biography of Kenny Everett, as well as appearing in the film Diana which starred Naomi Watts and was directed by Oliver Hirschbiegel. The film was released in 2013.

In 2014, he played Neil in In the Club, returning for Series 2, in 2016.

He also appeared in and wrote original music for an ongoing film project called FLiM by Raffaello Degruttola.

2015 was a busy year for Kerrigan. He filmed a ten-part drama for SKY 1 called The Five written by Harlen Coben playing American businessman Stuart Carew. He also filmed series 2 of  In the Club, both of which are to be screened in 2016.

Kerrigan and his wife both appeared in Death in Paradise “Murder Most Animal” (S8:E2) in 2019. She played his wife. In 2021 he played Richard in 4th season of Kay Mellor's the Syndicate.

Personal life
In the 1990s, Kerrigan dated his Casualty co-star, Claire Goose. In 2011, he married actress Shelley Conn, whom he had been in a relationship with for a decade. In 2012 they had a son.

References

External links

BDi Composer

1972 births
Living people
Alumni of Bretton Hall College
English people of Irish descent
English male television actors
English television composers
English male composers
People from Lincolnshire
People from Kentish Town